Ellen Kovner Silbergeld (born 1945) is a leading American expert in the field of environmental health.

Background

Elizabeth Kovner was born in 1945. Her parents were Joseph Kovner, a lawyer (then with the Congress of Industrial Organizations) and Mary Helen Gion. She has two siblings.

After graduating from Vassar College summa cum laude in 1967, she earned a Ph.D. in environmental engineering at Johns Hopkins University in 1972.

Career

She is a professor at the Bloomberg School of Public Health at Johns Hopkins University and used to be on the faculty at the University of Maryland, Baltimore. Before that she worked as a scientist for Environmental Defense. She was editor-in-chief of the journal Environmental Research she serves on many other editorial boards
She is an authority on the toxicological manifestations of lead and mercury poisoning, having done some of the first research on how lead affects the central nervous system. Silbergeld has also been involved in public policy and raised public awareness of the dangers of lead. Her current research focuses on the role is food animal production in the selection and dissemination of antimicrobial resistance. She has written a book on this topic, Chickenizing Farms and Food published by Johns Hopkins University Press in 2016.

In 1993, she received the prestigious MacArthur Fellowship ("genius award") from the MacArthur Foundation.

Works

References

External links

Papers, 1968-1994. Schlesinger Library, Radcliffe Institute, Harvard University.

1945 births
Living people
Johns Hopkins University faculty
Vassar College alumni
MacArthur Fellows
Johns Hopkins University alumni
American toxicologists
Academic journal editors